Anthems is the debut album by British-American rock band Pure Love, released February 4, 2013. The group formed in 2011 after the departure of lead singer Frank Carter from the hardcore punk band Gallows, after which he began sharing song ideas with Jim Carroll of The Hope Conspiracy and The Suicide File; the two had met when Gallows supported The Hope Conspiracy in 2006. The group signed to Vertigo Records in February 2012 and began working with producer Gil Norton, playing a number of new songs in their debut performance at the NME Awards that February. Prior to Anthem's release, the band debuted several songs online as music videos and downloads. The album was initially scheduled for release in October 2012 but was delayed to February 2013.

Track listing

Personnel
Pure Love
Frank Carter – lead vocals
Jim Carroll – guitars, backing vocals, scrap piano on Anthem
Session musicians
Jol Mulholland – bass guitar
Jared Shavelson – drums, percussion
Oliver Edsforth – Hammond organ, piano, keyboards, sub bass synth
Kate Orgias – violin on Heavy Kind of Chain
Sarah Carter – additional vocals on Riot Song and March of the Pilgrims

Production
Gil Norton – production, mixing, programming
Dan Austin – engineering
Brian Paul Lamotte – art direction, design
Andreas Laszlo Konrath – photography

References

2012 debut albums
Garage rock revival albums
Pure Love (band) albums